Strontium chloride (SrCl2) is a salt of strontium and chloride. It is a 'typical' salt, forming neutral aqueous solutions. As with all compounds of strontium, this salt emits a bright red colour in flame, and is commonly used in fireworks to that effect. Its properties are intermediate between those for barium chloride, which is more toxic, and calcium chloride.

Preparation
Strontium chloride can be prepared by treating aqueous strontium hydroxide or strontium carbonate with hydrochloric acid:

Crystallization from cold aqueous solution gives the hexahydrate, SrCl2·6H2O. Dehydration of this salt occurs in stages, commencing above .

Structure
In the solid state, SrCl2 adopts a fluorite structure. In the vapour phase the SrCl2 molecule is non-linear with a Cl-Sr-Cl angle of approximately 130°. This is an exception to VSEPR theory which would predict a linear structure. Ab initio calculations have been cited to propose that contributions from d orbitals in the shell below the valence shell are responsible. Another proposal is that polarisation of the electron core of the strontium atom causes a distortion of the core electron density that interacts with the Sr-Cl bonds.

Uses 
Strontium chloride is a precursor to other compounds of strontium, such as yellow strontium chromate, strontium carbonate, and strontium sulfate. Exposure of aqueous solutions of strontium chloride to the sodium salt of the desired anion often leads to formation of the solid precipitate:

SrCl2 + Na2CrO4  →  SrCrO4 + 2 NaCl
SrCl2 +  Na2CO3  →  SrCO3 + 2 NaCl
SrCl2 + Na2SO4  →  SrSO4 + 2 NaCl

Strontium chloride is often used as a red colouring agent in pyrotechnics. It imparts a much more intense red colour to the flames than most alternatives. It is employed in small quantities in glass-making and metallurgy. The radioactive isotope strontium-89, used for the treatment of bone cancer, is usually administered in the form of strontium chloride. Seawater aquaria require small amounts of strontium chloride, which is consumed during the growth of certain plankton.

Dental care
SrCl2 is useful in reducing tooth sensitivity by forming a barrier over microscopic tubules in the dentin containing nerve endings that have become exposed by gum recession. Known in the U.S. as Elecol and Sensodyne, these products are called "strontium chloride toothpastes", although most now use saltpeter (KNO3) instead which works as an analgesic rather than a barrier.

Biological research 
Brief strontium chloride exposure induces parthenogenetic activation of oocytes which is used in developmental biological research.

Ammonium storage 
A commercial company is using a strontium chloride-based artificial solid called AdAmmine as a means to store ammonium at low pressure, mainly for use in NOx emission reduction on Diesel vehicles. They claim that their patented material can also be made from some other salts, but they have chosen strontium chloride for mass production. Earlier company research also considered using the stored ammonium as a means to store synthetic Ammonium fuel under the trademark HydrAmmine and the press name "hydrogen tablet", however, this aspect has not been commercialized. Their processes and materials are patented. Their early experiments used magnesium chloride, and is also mentioned in that article.

Soil testing 
Strontium chloride is used with citric acid in soil testing as an universal extractant of plant nutrients.

References

External links

Chlorides
Strontium compounds
Alkaline earth metal halides
Fluorite crystal structure